Acid Mt. Fuji  is a studio album by Japanese electronic producer Susumu Yokota, originally released in 1994 on the Japanese label Sublime Records and later remastered and reissued in 2018 on Midgar. It is notable as being one of his first records to engage with techno music, as well as its psychedelic and atmospheric sound.

Background and composition
Acid Mt. Fuji was Yokota's first record to demonstrate his capability as a techno music producer. As well as this, the record makes use of oscillating manipulated sounds like forest field recordings and electronic percussion, especially drum machines that serve as backing, which prominently appear as echoes. The sample at the beginning of track 11, "Tanuki", is supposedly the voice of American neuroscientist and psychonaut John C. Lilly. The record ends with a field recording of the ocean, apparently one by Mount Fuji itself.

The literal translation of the Japanese title on the cover, 'Red Fuji', references Edo period artist Hokusai's wood block print "Fine Wind, Clear Morning"; the artwork is a manipulated version of it.

In Resident Advisor's review of Acid Mt. Fuji, they noted its references to Japanese supernatural folklore, such as yōkai, as well as Shinto shrines, in the record's track titles; they also describe "Kinoko" and "Meijijingu" as the 'moment[s] where 'Acid Mt. Fuji's psychoactive properties kick in and the real trip begins'. Jon Williams of experimental group Excepter, guest-writing for the music blog Listen to This, compared the record's sound to Robert Hood and Popol Vuh.

Track listing

Personnel
 A&R – Masato Tani
 Co-producer – Nobolu Kaneko
 Design – Katsuhiko Kimura
 Executive producer – Katsuo Michishita
 All tracks created by – Susumu Yokota
 Label – Manabu Yamazaki
 Total sound – Susumu Yokota

References

1994 albums
Susumu Yokota albums
Ambient techno albums
Acid techno albums
Experimental music albums by Japanese artists
Minimal music albums
Psychedelic music albums by Japanese artists
Industrial albums by Japanese artists